Çamlıbel  (formerly Karaböcülü) is a village in Silifke district of Mersin Province, Turkey. It is situated to in the Taurus Mountains. The population of Çamlıbel was 134 as of 2011. 
The village was founded on the ruins of an ancient farm complex of the Roman and  early Byzantine  era. (3rd-5th centuries) . There are ruins of houses, cisterns, churches and the like. Major economic activities are farming and animal breeding.

References

Villages in Silifke District